Jakub Kohák (born 10 October 1974) is a Czech actor and film director. He is best known for directing commercials and has been an actor in a number of films including Tiger Theory and The Good Plumber.

References

External links
 

1974 births
Living people
Czech male film actors
Czech film directors
Actors from Prague